"The Bluegrass Special" is a 1977 episode of The Wonderful World of Disney starring William Windom, Celeste Holm, Devon Ericson and Davy Jones which originally aired on NBC on May 22, 1977.

Synopsis
Penny is a teenage horse trainer with a very special dream of becoming a jockey. She picks Woodhill to compete in the upcoming Bluegrass Special; Woodhill is a beautiful race horse with a bad reputation who threw and injured his rider during a race in Tijuana. Penny's devotion and determination are an inspiration to anyone who believes that dreams can come true!

Cast
William Windom as Phil Wainright
Celeste Holm as Deirdre Wainwright
Devon Ericson as Penny Wainwright
Davy Jones as Davey Sanders

Home video
On April 26, 2009, "The Bluegrass Special" was released as a Disney Movie Club exclusive DVD, available only to club members for mail or online ordering.

References

External links

1977 American television episodes
Walt Disney anthology television series episodes
American horse racing films
Films directed by Andrew McLaglen
Films produced by James Algar
Films scored by Buddy Baker (composer)
Disney television films